Diego Coppola (born 28 December 2003) is an Italian professional footballer who plays as a centre-back for Serie A club Hellas Verona.

Club career
After coming through the youth ranks of Hellas Verona, Coppola made his professional debut with the first team on 15 December 2021, coming on as a substitute during a 4–3 Coppa Italia loss to Empoli. He subsequently made his Serie A debut on 15 January 2022, replacing Adrien Tameze at the 80th minute of the league game against Sassuolo. On 27 February, the defender made his first start for Verona, playing the entirety of the Serie A game against Venezia.

On 20 April 2022, Coppola officially extended his contract with the club, signing a new five-year deal.

International career
Coppola has represented Italy at various youth international levels, having played for the under-18, under-19 and under-20 national teams.

Both in May and December 2022, he was involved in training camps led by the Italian senior national team's manager, Roberto Mancini, and aimed to the most promising national talents.

Style of play 
A centre-back that can play both in a back three or in a back four, Coppola has showed good athleticism despite his height, as well as a notable tactical intelligence and decent ball-playing skills.

Positioning, marking and anticipation are his strongest traits in the defensive phase of his game.

Career statistics

References

External links
 
 Lega Serie A Profile
 FIGC U18 Profile
 FIGC U19 Profile

2003 births
Living people
Footballers from Brescia
Italian footballers
Hellas Verona F.C. players
Serie A players
Association football defenders